Griffen may refer to:

 Gribshunden or Griffen, a 15th-century Danish warship
 Griffen, Austria, a town in the district of Völkermarkt in Carinthia
 Griffen Gun, an artillery cannon invented by John Griffen and used by the North during the American Civil War
 Griffen Island, West Virginia, U.S.

See also
 Griffin (disambiguation)
 Griffon (disambiguation)